Eric L. Householder (born June 5, 1968, in Baltimore, Maryland) is an American politician and a Republican member of the West Virginia House of Delegates representing District 64 since January 12, 2013. Householder served consecutively from January 2011 until January 2013 in the District 56 seat.

Education
Householder earned his BS in economics from Shepherd College (now Shepherd University) and his MBA from Frostburg State University.

Elections
2010: When District 56 Democratic Representative Bob Tabb left the Legislature and left the seat open, Householder was unopposed for the May 11, 2010 Republican Primary, winning with 494 votes, and won the November 2, 2010 General election with 3,322 votes (56.4%) against Democratic nominee Terry Walker.
2012: Redistricted to District 64, Householder was unopposed for both the May 8, 2012 Republican Primary, winning with 888 votes, and the November 6, 2012 General election, winning with 4,882 votes.
2014: Householder won his third term in the House, as he was unopposed on the ballot for the 64th District.
2016: Householder was elected to the House for a fourth time, defeating Democratic challenger Barbara "Barby" Frankenberry.

References

External links
Official page at the West Virginia Legislature
Campaign site

Eric Householder at Ballotpedia
Eric L. Householder at OpenSecrets

1968 births
21st-century American politicians
Living people
Frostburg State University alumni
Politicians from Baltimore
Politicians from Martinsburg, West Virginia
Republican Party members of the West Virginia House of Delegates
Shepherd University alumni